The Pacific lamprey (Entosphenus tridentatus) is an anadromous parasitic lamprey from the Pacific Coast of North America and Asia. It is a member of the Petromyzontidae family. The Pacific lamprey is also known as the three-tooth lamprey and tridentate lamprey.

Description

They are anadromous and semelparous. They have slender, elongated bodies with two dorsal fins arising far back on the body. The anal fins are rudimentary and the lower lobe of the caudal fin is larger than the upper lobe and both lobes are continuous with the dorsal fin and the anal fin. Adults living in the sea are a bluish-black or greenish colour above and pale below, but those in fresh water are brown. This species is distinguished by having three (or occasionally two) sharp teeth on the supraoral bar above the mouth and three sharp points on each lateral plate. The Pacific lamprey are often found at sea or often far offshore. At sea, depth: near surface to 1,508 m (4,946 ft)

Biology
Although the adult and juvenile stages are more noticeable, lampreys spend the majority of their lives as larvae (ammocoetes). Ammocoetes live in fresh water for many years (usually 3–7 years, but at least one species has been recorded for +17 years). Ammocoetes are filter feeders that draw overlying water into burrows they dig into soft bottom substrates. After the larval period, the ammocoetes undergo metamorphosis and take on the juvenile/adult body morphology. Juveniles/adults have a jawless, sucker-like mouth that allows them to become parasitic on other fish and sperm whales, attaching themselves with their suckers and feeding on blood and body fluids. The adults live at least one to two years in the ocean and then return to fresh water to spawn. Whether Pacific lampreys return to their natal streams or seek spawning areas based on other cues is not known. They typically spawn in similar habitat to Pacific salmon and trout. Lampreys construct a nest (redd) in small gravel and females can lay over 100,000 eggs, which are fertilized externally by the male. After spawning, the adults usually die within four days. Also, like salmon, the Pacific lamprey does not feed while migrating to spawn.

Cultural use and food
Pacific lampreys are an important ceremonial food for Native American tribes in the Columbia River basin and the Yurok people and Karuk of the Klamath River Wiyot people of the Eel River in northern California. Pacific lamprey numbers in the Columbia River have greatly declined with the construction of the Columbia River hydropower system. Almost no harvest opportunity for Native Americans remains in the Columbia River and its tributaries except for a small annual harvest at Willamette Falls on the Willamette River (tributary to the Columbia River). The Yurok and Wiyot snag lampreys in the surf at the mouth of the Klamath River, often at night, using hand-carved wooden "hooks". It is dangerous work. Because lampreys are fatty and have a very high caloric count, tribes like the Wiyot and Yurok have traditionally fed them to babies and young children. The high caloric count also make lampreys an important piece of the river ecosystem, as other animals also rely on them. The documentary film, The Lost Fish, chronicles how current tribal communities are actively studying, breeding, and working to restore lamprey and lamprey habitats to the waterways of the Pacific Northwest.

Ecological issues
Pacific lamprey numbers have greatly decreased due to human infrastructure. Damming rivers, channelization, and declines in water quality have impacted pacific lamprey habitat and their ability to live. However, restoration of rivers and streams in Southern California has re-established the fish in portions of their historic southern range. The Santa Margarita River recolonization has been attributed to a rebuilt weir and new fishway at Camp Pendleton which allowed the lamprey to find passage into the river.

The Pacific lamprey is not the same fish as the sea lamprey (Petromyzon marinus) that has invaded the Great Lakes via the Erie Canal.

References

Petromyzontidae
Fish of the Pacific Ocean
Fish of North America
Marine fauna of North America
Fish described in 1836
Animal parasites of fish
Parasitic animals of mammals